PM Sayeed Marine Birds Conservation Reserve is the first protected area for marine birds in India. It is located in the Indian Union Territory of Lakshadweep. It was formed in 2020. It covers an area of 62 km2.

The PM Sayeed Marine Birds Conservation Reserve will be home to four species of pelagic seabirds – the Greater crested tern, Lesser crested tern, Sooty tern, and the Brown noddy.

See also
Dr KK Mohammed Koya Sea Cucumber Conservation Reserve
Pichavaram
Karimpuzha Wildlife Sanctuary

References

Protected areas of India
Tourism in Lakshadweep
Nature conservation in India
Biodiversity
2020 establishments in Lakshadweep